Pedro de Alcántara Álvarez de Toledo y Silva (1729–1790) was a Spanish nobleman from the House of Alba. He was the 12th Duke of the Infantado and the first non-member of the House of Mendoza to hold the title.  He also held the dukedoms of Távara, Lerma and Pastrana, which had become associated with the dukedom of the Infantado throughout the ages.

Family Origins 

Pedro was the son of María Francisca de Silva y Gutiérrez de los Ríos, 11th Duchess of the Infantado and Miguel de Toledo y Pimentel.

Biography 

Pedro was known throughout his life as a big supporter of the enciclopedista tradition, or a contemporary Spanish movement that promoted the ideas of republicanism and democracy and sought to irradiate public ignorance and to establish natural liberty of man.

Marriage 
Pedro was recorded as having been married to Francisca Javiera de Velasco y Tovar, though it is likely she died at some point soon after their marriage. In 1758, Pedro married María Ana de Salm-Salm, a princess from the Belgian noble House of Salm.

See also 
 House of Alba
 Duke of the Infantado
 House of Mendoza

References 
 Most of the information on this page has been translated from its Spanish equivalent.

1729 births
1790 deaths
12
18th-century Spanish nobility